This list of Vogue Netherlands cover models is a catalog of cover models who have appeared on the cover of Vogue Netherlands, the Dutch edition of Vogue magazine, starting with the magazine's first issue in April 2012.

2012

2013

2014

2015

2016

2017

2018

2019

2020

2021

2022

2023

External links
Vogue Nederland
Vogue Netherlands at Models.com

Nederland
Vogue
Dutch fashion